The TCDD DM15000 is TCDD's newest diesel multiple unit (DMU) series. The DMUs were built by EUROTEM in Adapazarı, Turkey. These DMUs operate on most diesel operated regional lines in Turkey.

References

Diesel multiple units of Turkey
Turkish State Railways